Emmett Townsend Anderson (January 17, 1890 – March 20, 1969) was an American politician from the U.S. state of Washington. A member of the Republican Party, he served as the 12th Lieutenant Governor of Washington from 1953 to 1957.

Anderson unsuccessfully ran for governor in the 1956 gubernatorial election, losing to Democrat Albert D. Rosellini.

References

Lieutenant Governors of Washington (state)
1890 births
1969 deaths
20th-century American politicians